Onn may refer to:

Onn, the Irish name of the seventeenth letter of the Ogham alphabet
ONN, the Ohio News Network
Onn., a consumer electronics brand
Onn Abu Bakar, a Malaysian politician
Onn Jaafar, a Malayan politician
Onn Hafiz Ghazi, a Malaysian politician
Hussein Onn, a former Malaysian Prime Minister
Melanie Onn, a British politician
Shmuel Onn, a mathematician